

Events
8 January – Australia Unites: Reach Out To Asia raises $20 million for the 2004 Indian Ocean Tsunami relief effort. It is also the first time that Australia's three major commercial television stations have co-operated to broadcast such an event.
3 February – American science fiction drama series Lost premieres on the Seven Network.
12 February – Australia's Funniest Home Video Show returns and starts 2005 when AFHVS became Australia's Funniest Home Videos with a funky major revamp, a monster-revamped funky instrumental theme music and a relocation from Melbourne back to Sydney. This is the very first episode to be filmed at Nine's Sydney studios since 1999.
22 February – In The Price Is Right, contestant Joanne Segeviano won a record-breaking mega showcase of A$664,667 (about US$406,274.45), setting a record of becoming the largest winner in the show's franchise worldwide that would held on for exactly three years, until it was surpassed by Adam Rose's total of US1,153,908 (approximately A$1.5 million).
7 March – ABC launches a brand new digital channel ABC2.
13 April – The Seven Network's Melbourne headquarters suffer a 30-minute blackout, causing the network to be knocked off air nationwide. This resulted in Blue Heelers being interrupted in the midst of a four-part storyline; this episode is repeated the following week in all markets except Perth (where, due to the time difference, it was Home and Away which was interrupted).
26 April – The Great Outdoors host Tom Williams and his partner Kym Johnson win the second season of Dancing with the Stars.
1 May – Rove McManus wins the 2005 TV WEEK Gold Logie.
15 May – Random wins the first season of The X Factor, based on the British namesake singing competition, making them the first-ever group to win the show since the franchise's debut in 2004. Despite the cancellation following the first season, the series returned after a five-year hiatus that would air for seven more seasons until 2016.
25 May – Graham Kennedy dies at age 71. The network on which most of his shows aired, the Nine Network, passes up the offer to broadcast his funeral but Seven axes Nine's coverage, picks it up and wins it. Nine does eventually show parts of the funeral live.
June – Deal or No Deal host Andrew O'Keefe replaces Chris Reason as co-host when the title Sunday Sunrise became Weekend Sunrise.
26 June – Douglas Wood is interviewed by Sandra Sully about his time as a captive after Network Ten pays a reported $400,000 for an exclusive interview.
 22 July – Hi-5 celebrated its 300th episode.
15 August – Big Brother: Greg Mathew, along with twin brother David Mathew, also known as "The Logan Twins" is announced the winner of the fifth series.
20 August – Cheez TV ends after 10-year run with Jade Gatt and Ryan Lappin and it will be replaced by a new weekday morning children's cartoon programme Toasted TV.
22 August – Network Ten debuts another weekday morning children's cartoon programme called Toasted TV presented by Pip Russell and Dan Sweetman replacing Cheez TV.
25 August – After a one-year hiatus, The Mole returns to Australian television for its fifth season, hosted by Tom Williams after its original host Grant Bowler was unavailable due to a prior commitment.
22 September – The final episode of Australian medical drama series MDA airs on ABC.
17 October – Rob "Coach" Fulton, a resident from Sydney, becomes the first ever person to win $1 million on Who Wants to Be a Millionaire?. Just four episodes later, another resident from Sydney, Martin Flood, became the second and final person won the top prize, amid allegations of cheating.
27 October – Liz Cantor wins the fifth season of The Mole, taking home $203,000 in prize money. John Whitehall is revealed as the Mole, and Craig Murrell is the runner-up. Cantor would later embark on a role with Channel Seven in Brisbane as its fill-in weather presenter.
8 November – Home and Away actress Ada Nicodemou and her partner Aric Yegudkin win the third season of Dancing with the Stars.
21 November – Kate DeAraugo wins the third season of Australian Idol.
24 November – The very last ever episode of The Price Is Right goes to air on the Nine Network after a 5-year run then a 2-year run. The show was axed due to the strong competitions of rival Seven Network game show Deal or No Deal. This was host Larry Emdur's final appearance on Nine, before defecting to the Seven Network, where he remains to this day.
27 November – American science fiction fantasy series Smallville switches over to air on Network Ten.
30 November – American animated science fiction sitcom Futurama created by Matt Groening the creator of The Simpsons switches over to air on Network Ten joining The Simpsons as part of Happy Hour shown every Wednesday from 7:30 pm.
2 December – A Current Affair again draws with a final goodbye with Ray Martin in the hot-seat before semi-retiring for the very last time. As the program is rested for six weeks to try out a major reliable revamp, he is definitely to be replaced by Tracy Grimshaw from 2006 onwards. Grimshaw quits the Today show after 9 years as co-host. She will be replaced by former-Ten News anchor Jessica Rowe effective from 30 January 2006, then soon axed due to poor ratings. ACA returned on 30 January 2006
5 December – Wheel of Fortune returns to Channel Seven with a title Larry Emdur & Laura Csortan’s Wheel of Fortune, with Larry Emdur & Laura Csortan as both hosts. Emdur & Csortan (as Larry & Laura) became the Wheel's third and final hosting partnership since mirroring their welcome scene with Baby John Burgess & Adriana Xenides (as Burgo and Adriana, as they welcome the show together from 1995 to 1996), between 1984 and 1996 and Rob Elliott & Sophie Falkiner (as Rob and Sophie) between 1999 and 2003. The final edition of the Larry Emdur & Laura Csortan’s Wheel of Fortune was screened on 28 July 2006. Its return, host and letter turner was announced on Sunrise on 18 November 2005. The original series later returned with 20 unaired episodes in August 2006 featuring Steve Omecke and Sophie Falkiner as the last separate hosts, and aired in its 10am slot only for five weeks until 1 September.
15 December – American animated sitcom American Dad! debuts on the Seven Network.
16 December – Good Morning Australia ends with a final goodbye after a 14-year run on Network Ten from the studios of ATV-10 first out of Nunawading in 1992, then from Como Centre, South Yarra from 1993 onwards. Host Bert Newton leaves Channel Ten and signs up and returns to Nine Network to host game show Bert's Family Feud. The following year, Good Morning Australia time slot was replaced by 9am with David and Kim hosted by former Getaway reporter David Reyne and former National Nine News/Nightline presenter, Kim Watkins who both moved from the Nine Network to Channel Ten.

New channels
 7 March – ABC2
 5 December – Playhouse Disney

Debuts

Subscription television

New International Programming

Subscription television

Programming Changes

Changes to network affiliations
This is a list of programs which made their premiere on an Australian television network that had previously premiered on another Australian television network. The networks involved the switch of allegiances are predominantly both free-to-air networks or both subscription television networks. Programs have their free-to-air/subscription television premiere, after previously premiering on the platform (free-to-air to subscription/subscription to free-to-air). are not included. In some cases, programs may still air on the original television network. This occurs predominantly with programs shared between subscription television networks.

Domestic

International

Free-to-air premieres
This is a list of programs which made their premiere on Australian free-to-air television that had previously premiered on Australian subscription television. Programs may still air on the original subscription television network.

International

Subscription premieres
This is a list of programs which made their premiere on Australian subscription television that had previously premiered on Australian free-to-air television. Programs may still air on the original free-to-air television network.

International

Specials

Television shows

1950s

1960s
Four Corners (1961–present)

1970s

1980s

1990s

2000s
2001
 Big Brother (2001–2008, 2012–2014)
 All Aussie Adventures (2001–2002, 2017)

2002
 Kath & Kim (2002–2007)

2003
 Australian Idol (2003–2009)
 Deal or No Deal (2003–2013)

2004
 Border Security: Australia's Front Line (2004–present)
 Dancing with the Stars (2004–present)

Ending / Resting this year

TV movies

Miniseries

International

See also 
 2005 in Australia
 List of Australian films of 2005

References